Televisora Sindoni or TVS is a Venezuelan regional television network based in the city of Maracay, Aragua State. It was launched in 1994 by the businessmen Filippo Sindoni.

See also
List of Venezuelan television channels

References

External links
Official Site 
Empresas Sindoni
TVS's program chart: http://www.tvs.net.ve/programacion.html.

Spanish-language television stations
Television channels and stations established in 1994
Television networks in Venezuela
Television stations in Venezuela
1994 establishments in Venezuela
Mass media in Maracay